Mohammed Abdullah Mubarak al-Balushi (born 27 August 1989), commonly known as Mohammed al-Sheiba, is an Omani footballer who plays for Al-Nahda Club.

Career
Mohammed Al-Balushi is the first Omani player to play professionally in Africa when he was loaned in 2008 to Al-Ahly (Tripoli) of Libya. He then moved to Al-Arabi SC where he played for a full season and displayed a great performance with the club and with the Oman national football team. His solid defensive abilities plus the gift to score goals made him a target to a number of international clubs such as AJ Auxerre and some regional giants such as Al-Shabab (Saudi Arabia).

But on 22 July 2009, Al-Wasl FC of the UAE won the race and signed the gifted Omani footballer for a season long loan. Before the end of the season, "Al Shaiba" proved his worth, and accepted a four-year contract from Al-Wasl FC. On 29 December 2013, Sheiba signed for his first club Al-Nahda Club for a period of 6 months.

Club career statistics

International career

Gulf Cup of Nations
Mohammed has made appearances in the 2009 Gulf Cup of Nations, the 2010 Gulf Cup of Nations and has represented the national team in the 2013 Gulf Cup of Nations.

AFC Asian Cup Qualification
Mohammed has made appearances in the 2011 AFC Asian Cup qualification and the 2015 AFC Asian Cup qualification.

FIFA World Cup Qualification
Mohammed has made four appearances in the 2010 FIFA World Cup qualification and eleven in the 2014 FIFA World Cup qualification.

In the 2014 FIFA World Cup qualification, he scored one goal in the Fourth Round in a 1–1 draw against Iraq. Oman entered the last game of group play with a chance to qualify for at least the playoff-round, but a 1–0 loss to Jordan eliminated them from contention.

National team career statistics

Goals for Senior National Team
Scores and results list Oman's goal tally first.

Honours

Club
With Al-Arabi
Sheikh Jassem Cup (1): 2008
With Al-Wasl
GCC Champions League (1): 2009
With Al-Wahda
UAE Super Cup (1): 2011
With Al-Nahda
Oman Professional League (1): 2013-14
Sultan Qaboos Cup (0): Runner-up 2013

References

External links

Mohammed Al-Balushi at Goal.com

1989 births
Living people
Omani footballers
Oman international footballers
Omani expatriate footballers
Association football defenders
Al-Nahda Club (Oman) players
Al-Arabi SC (Qatar) players
Al-Wasl F.C. players
Al Wahda FC players
Qatar Stars League players
Oman Professional League players
Expatriate footballers in Libya
Omani expatriate sportspeople in Libya
Expatriate footballers in the United Arab Emirates
Omani expatriate sportspeople in the United Arab Emirates
Expatriate footballers in Qatar
Omani expatriate sportspeople in Qatar
Omani people of Baloch descent
UAE Pro League players
2019 AFC Asian Cup players